Whitehead's algorithm is a mathematical algorithm in group theory for solving the automorphic equivalence problem in the finite rank free group Fn. The algorithm is based on a classic 1936 paper of J. H. C. Whitehead. It is still unknown (except for the case n = 2) if Whitehead's algorithm has polynomial time complexity.

Statement of the problem

Let  be a free group of rank  with a free basis . The automorphism problem, or the automorphic equivalence problem for  asks, given two freely reduced words  whether there exists an automorphism  such that .

Thus the automorphism problem asks, for  whether .

History

Whitehead used a topological approach in his paper. Whitehead moves can be represented by certain kinds of topological "swapping" moves modifying the sphere system.

Subsequently, Rapaport, and later, based on her work, Higgins and Lyndon, gave a purely combinatorial and algebraic re-interpretation of Whitehead's work and of Whitehead's algorithm. The exposition of Whitehead's algorithm in the book of Lyndon and Schupp is based on this combinatorial approach. Culler and Vogtmann, in their 1986 paper that introduced the Outer space, gave a hybrid approach to Whitehead's algorithm, presented in combinatorial terms but closely following Whitehead's original ideas.

Whitehead's algorithm

Our exposition regarding Whitehead's algorithm mostly follows Ch.I.4 in the book of Lyndon and Schupp, as well as.

Overview

The automorphism group  has a particularly useful finite generating set  of Whitehead automorphisms or Whitehead moves.

If , we check if there exists a finite chain of Whitehead moves taking  to  so that the cyclically reduced length remains constant throughout this chain. The elements  are not automorphically equivalent in  if and only if such a chain exists.

Namely, given , if Whitehead's algorithm concludes that , the algorithm also outputs an automorphism  such that .

Whitehead automorphisms

(i) There is a permutation  of  such that for 

Such  is called a Whitehead automorphism of the first kind.

(ii)  There is an element , called the multiplier, such that for every 

Such  is called a Whitehead automorphism of the second kind.

Examples
Let .

Let  be a homomorphism such that
 

Let  be a homomorphism such that
 

Automorphically minimal and Whitehead minimal elements

For , the conjugacy class  is called automorphically minimal if for every  we have . 
Also, a conjugacy class  is called Whitehead minimal if for every Whitehead move  we have .

Thus, by definition, if  is automorphically minimal then it is also Whitehead minimal. It turns out that the converse is also true.

Whitehead's "Peak Reduction Lemma"

Let . Then the following hold:

(1) If  is not automorphically minimal, then there exists a Whitehead automorphism  such that  .

(2) Suppose that  is automorphically minimal, and that another conjugacy class  is also automorphically minimal. Then  if and only if  and there exists a finite sequence of Whitehead moves  such that

and

Part (1) of the Peak Reduction Lemma implies that a conjugacy class  is Whitehead minimal if and only if it is automorphically minimal.

The automorphism graph

Two distinct vertices  are adjacent in  if  and there exists a Whitehead automorphism  such that .

Whitehead graph

See Proposition 4.16 in Ch. I of. This fact plays a key role in the proof of Whitehead's peak reduction result.

Whitehead's minimization algorithm

Whitehead's minimization algorithm, given a freely reduced word , finds an automorphically minimal  such that 

This algorithm proceeds as follows. Given , put . If  is already constructed, check if there exists a Whitehead automorphism  such that . If such  exists, put  and go to the next step.

Whitehead's algorithm for the automorphic equivalence problem

Whitehead's algorithm for the automorphic equivalence problem, given  decides whether or not .

The algorithm proceeds as follows. If , declare that  and terminate the algorithm. Suppose now that . Then check if there exists a 
finite sequence of Whitehead moves  such that

and

More specifically, using the breadth-first approach, one constructs the connected components  of the automorphism graph and checks if .

If such a sequence exists, declare that , and terminate the algorithm. If no such sequence exists, declare that  and terminate the algorithm.

Moreover, if , the algorithm actually produces (as a composition of Whitehead moves) an automorphism  such that .

Computational complexity of Whitehead's algorithm

Moreover, even if  is not considered fixed, (an adaptation of) the Whitehead minimization algorithm on an input  terminates in time .

Applications, generalizations and related results

McCool also used the peak reduction method to construct of a finite presentation of the group  with the set of Whitehead automorphisms as the generating set.
Gersten obtained a variation of Whitehead's algorithm, for deciding, given two finite subsets , whether the subgroups  are automorphically equivalent, that is, whether there exists  such that .
Whitehead's algorithm and peak reduction play a key role in the proof by Culler and Vogtmann that the Culler–Vogtmann Outer space is contractible.
Collins and Zieschang obtained analogs of Whitehead's peak reduction and of Whitehead's algorithm for automorphic equivalence in free products of groups.
Gilbert used a version of a peak reduction lemma to construct a presentation for the automorphism group  of a free product .
Levitt and Vogtmann produced a Whitehead-type algorithm for saving the automorphic equivalence problem (for elects, m-tuples of elements and m-tuples of conjugacy classes) in a group  where  is a closed hyperbolic surface.
The Garside algorithm for solving the conjugacy problem in braid groups has a similar general structure to Whitehead's algorithm, with "cycling moves" playing the role of Whitehead moves.
Day obtained analogs of Whitehead's algorithm and of Whitehead's peak reduction for automorphic equivalence of elements of right-angled Artin groups.

References

Further reading

Heiner Zieschang, On the Nielsen and Whitehead methods in combinatorial group theory and topology. Groups—Korea '94 (Pusan), 317–337, Proceedings of the 3rd International Conference on the Theory of Groups held at Pusan National University, Pusan, August 18–25, 1994. Edited by A. C. Kim and D. L. Johnson. de Gruyter, Berlin, 1995;   
Karen Vogtmann's lecture notes on Whitehead's algorithm using Whitehead's 3-manifold model

Group theory
Algorithms